Fenimore is both a given name and a surname. Notable people with the name include:

Given name:
 Constance Fenimore Woolson (1840–1894), American novelist and short story writer
 Fenimore Chatterton (1860–1958), American businessman, politician, and lawyer
 James Fenimore Cooper (1789–1851), American writer
 Susan Fenimore Cooper (1813–1894), American writer and amateur naturalist

Surname:
 Bob Fenimore (1925–2010), Oklahoma State Cowboys football player

Fictional characters:
 Lieutenant Fenimore, fictional character in a short story of the Cosmicomics by Italo Calvino

See also
 Fenimore Art Museum, in Cooperstown, New York, United States
 Fenimore Pass, strait in Alaska